Dope is a 1924 Australian silent film about a respected citizen who is blackmailed by someone from his past. It is considered a lost film.

Synopsis
Hugh Murnin, a pillar of Sydney society, has a secret past as a pearler on Thursday Island, during which time he believes he killed a man in a drunken brawl. He is blackmailed by one of his old drinking mates, Slick Harvey, who also tries to seduce Murnin's daughter, Mildred (Lorraine Esmond). Mildred's fiancé, Tom (Gordon Collingridge) exposes Harvey as the leader of a gang of opium smugglers and that it was he, not Murnin, who killed the man on Thursday Island. Mildred and Tom get married.

Cast
Gordon Collingridge as Tom Searle
Lorraine Esmond as Mildred Murnin
Charles Villiers 
Monica Mack
Robert Purdie
Jack Raymond
William Newman
J.N. Tait

Production
The script was written by Sydney journalist and author Con Drew, and was originally titled The Trail of the Twang.

Shooting took place in April 1923 but it was not released until the following year.

Reception
The film received poor reviews and unenthusiastic public reception.

Australasian Picture Productions Scandal
Dope was the only film from Australasian Picture Productions, which is not to be confused with Australasian Films. The company was registered on 1 February 1923 in Queensland by promoters Stephen Perry and Percy McMahon. Under the terms of the corporation, Perry and McMahon were to receive £1,000 in part payment for their services, plus £1,560 annually for seven years and 6,000 fully paid-up shares. By 30 June 1924 the company's profit and loss statement showed director's salaries of £1,705, office salaries of £154 and general expenses of £230. In December of the year the company went into liquidation owing £2,974.

"The investigations satisfy me, that the company was a swindle", said Justice McNaughten in the Supreme Court of New South Wales. "An investigation is necessary...There was a gross fraud on the part of one of the promoters. All they did was to produce one abortive film. There is no doubt that this is a case for the most searching investigation."

The petition to wind up the company was made by James Duhig, the Roman Catholic Archbishop of Brisbane. Litigation concerning the company was still going on in 1928.

References

External links

Dope at National Film and Sound Archive

1924 films
Australian drama films
Australian silent films
Australian black-and-white films
Lost Australian films
1924 drama films
1924 lost films
Lost drama films
Films directed by Dunstan Webb
Silent drama films